The Pick-up Artist is a 1987 American romantic comedy drama film produced and distributed by 20th Century Fox, written and directed by James Toback, starring Molly Ringwald and Robert Downey Jr. in the lead roles.

Synopsis 

Randy Jensen (Ringwald) is a smart, independent tour guide who beats womanizer Jack Jericho (Downey Jr.) at his own game. After a quick fling, her indifference only causes him to become smitten with her.

Randy is too busy for romance, trying to keep her alcoholic gambler father, Flash Jensen (Hopper), out of harm's way. Jack's persistence soon pays off when he offers to help rescue Randy's dad from the mob.

Cast 
 Molly Ringwald as Randy Jensen
 Robert Downey Jr. as Jack Jericho
 Dennis Hopper as "Flash" Jensen
 Danny Aiello as Phil Harper
 Mildred Dunnock as Nellie
 Harvey Keitel as Alonzo Scolara
 Bob Gunton as Fernando Portacarrero 
 Brian Hamill as Mike
 Tamara Bruno as Karen
 Vanessa L. Williams as Rae, Girl with Dog
 Angie Kempf as Jack's Student
 Polly Draper as Pat, Jack's Colleague
 Victor Argo as Harris
 Frederick Koehler as Richie
 Robert Towne as Stan
 Victoria Jackson as Lulu
 Lorraine Bracco as Carla
 Fred Melamed as George
 Joe Spinell as Eddie
 Daniel Smith as Casino Cashier
 Christine Baranski as Harriet, Woman on Bus

Production 
James Toback wrote the film for Warren Beatty who liked the script but was reluctant to play a character driven by his erotic compulsions. Toback then considered Robert De Niro but ultimately decided the role should be played by a younger actor.

The film was at Paramount. Then in 1984 Beatty bought it and set up the production at Fox. Toback says the film was "not even remotely" based on Beatty. "The guy in the script chases after people. Warren always has people chasing after him."

It was Toback's fourth film as director. He says his first three "were all dark movies that ended unhappily. Now I'm taking a vacation from dread and gloom. If you were casting Pick Up Artist 30 years ago you would have wanted Cary Grant and Irene Dunne. No two actors would have been more wrong for my other movies."

Reception

Critical response 
The film has gained generally mixed reviews. On Rotten Tomatoes the film holds a 61% rating based on 23 reviews.

Box office 
The film opened at number 5 at the US Box Office.

Home media 
The film was released on Laser Disc in 1987, then on DVD on December 16, 2003.

References

External links
 
 
 

1987 films
1987 romantic comedy films
20th Century Fox films
American romantic comedy films
1980s English-language films
Films scored by Georges Delerue
Films directed by James Toback
Films set in Atlantic City, New Jersey
Films set in New York City
Films shot in New Jersey
Films shot in New York City
1980s American films